The SR engine is a series of ,  or  straight-four, four-stroke gasoline engines manufactured by Nissan. It has an aluminium head and block with steel sleeves and has a DOHC 4-valve design, with variable valve timing on select models.

The engine was used in many small to medium Nissan vehicles, including high-performance turbocharged variants. It was designed by Nissan as a replacement of the earlier CA series of engines, and was replaced by the QR and MR series of engines. Power outputs are shown under JIS Net PS or ECE Net kilowatts unless otherwise indicated.

SR16VE

The  SR16VE has Nissan's Neo VVL variable valve timing with lift control. Redline is at 8300 rpm.

This engine was never used on the USDM counterpart of the B14 Lucino, the B14 Nissan 200SX, as it uses the 1.6 L GA16DE and 2.0 L SR20DE engines instead.

It is used in the following vehicles:
 N15 Nissan Pulsar VZ-R
 B14 Nissan Lucino VZ-R
 B15 Nissan Sunny VZ-R

SR16VE N1

This version was used in the limited-production Pulsar VZ-R N1, produced from 1997 to 1998. These cars were tuned by Autech Japan. Redline of the N1 Version 2 (1998) is at 8600 rpm. This is also claimed to be the most powerful production 1.6 L naturally aspirated engine.

SR18Di

The SR18Di is a  DOHC engine. Based on the Single Point Fuel Injection system, it was installed on JDM cars and some UK versions. This model used some cast iron blocks and it was used on the P10 generation Nissan Primera, but due to the low overall power this engine option was dropped on the next generation.

This engine was never used on the USDM counterpart of the P10/11 Primera, the Infiniti G20, as it uses the 2.0 L SR20DE engine instead.

It is used in the following vehicles:
 1990-1993 Nissan Primera
 Nissan Sunny
 Nissan Bluebird U12
 Nissan Avenir W10

SR18DE

The SR18DE is a  DOHC engine. This engine came with Multi Point Fuel Injection System ECCS (Electronic Concentrated Control System). The SR18DE crankshaft was produced with four fewer counterweights than the SR20DE variants, which have eight, for lighter weight and better fuel efficiency. These lightweight crankshafts were also homologated for use in the Japanese N2 Silvia racing program and later used in the SR20VE engine.

This engine was never used on the USDM counterpart of the P10/11 Primera, the Infiniti G20, as it uses the 2.0 L SR20DE engine instead.

It is used in the following vehicles:
 1991-1997 Nissan Primera
 Nissan Sunny
 Nissan Avenir W10
 Nissan Rasheen
 1991-1997 Nissan Bluebird U13
 1989-1998 Nissan Bluebird U14  Factory detuning and refining of fuel injection.
 1989(??)-2001 Nissan Presea

SR20Di

The SR20Di is a  DOHC engine. It produces . Similar to the 1.8 liter version except for bigger displacement with a throttle body injection system.

This engine was never used on the USDM counterpart of the P10/11 Primera, the Infiniti G20, as it uses the 2.0 L SR20DE engine instead.

It is used in the following vehicles:
 1991–1994.6 Nissan Primera

SR20DE

The SR20DE is a  DOHC engine. It was used in over 15 Nissan models, first appearing in the U12 Bluebird on October 1989. It was gradually phased out over time with the introduction of the low-emissions QR engine family in 2000, until production stopped in 2002.

The breakdown of the engine code is as follows:
 SR - Engine 
 20 - 2.0 Litres
 D  - Dual Overhead Cams
 E  - Electronic Fuel Injection

This engine has the following specifications (SAE, 1991):

It is used in the following vehicles:

SR20DET

The SR20DET is a  DOHC engine. It was first used in the U12 Bluebird SSS ATTESA Limited from October 1989, and expanded to several cars from 1989 through 2002. The Silvia was the longest-running Nissan model to use this engine, starting with the S13 series in 1991 and ending with the S15 series in 2002. This engine was replaced with the QR20DE engine in most applications. 

It is used in the following vehicles:
 1989-1991 Nissan Bluebird HNU12 SSS ATTESA Limited
 1990-1995 Nissan Pulsar RNN14 GTi-R
 1991-1994 Nissan Silvia S13 K's
 1991-1997 Nissan Bluebird HNU13 SSS ATTESA Limited
 1991-1998 Nissan 180SX S13
 1994-1998 Nissan Silvia S14 K's
 1994-1998 Nissan 200SX S14 + "S14a"
 1994 Nismo 270R
 1995-1998 Nissan Avenir PNW10 Salut G GT Turbo
 1997-2001 Nissan R'nessa NN30 GT Turbo
 1998-2002 Nissan Avenir PNW11 Highway Star/GT4
 1998-2002 Nissan Liberty PNM12 GT4
 1999-2002 Nissan Silvia S15 Spec-R (JDM)
 1999-2002 Nissan 200SX S15 (AUDM and NZDM)

SR20VE

The  SR20VE has Nissan's Neo VVL variable valve timing with lift control.

This engine was never used on the USDM counterpart of the P11 Primera, the Infiniti G20, as it uses the 2.0 L SR20DE engine instead.

It is used in the following vehicles:

 1997-2000 P11 JDM Nissan Primera Te-V sedan or G-V wagon, 
 2001-2003 P12 JDM Nissan Primera, 20V sedan or W20V Wagon, 
 1997-2000 U14 JDM Nissan Bluebird SSS-Z sedan, 
 1997-2000 Y11 JDM Nissan Wingroad ZV-S wagon, 
 ASL Garaiya sports car,

SR20VET 

The  SR20VET was the first turbocharged engine from Nissan with variable valve lift (VVL), produced exclusively for the Japanese market.

It is used in the following vehicles:
 2001-2007 PNT30 Nissan X-Trail GT

Camshaft Lift and Duration

See also
List of Nissan engines

References

External links
SR20 Engine Buildup
NeoVVL Owners Club The Resource for the NeoVVL Engine
The SR20VE Motor Mini-Site

SR
Straight-four engines
Gasoline engines by model